The Guianas, sometimes called by the Spanish loan-word Guayanas (Las Guayanas), is a region in north-eastern South America which includes the following three territories:

 French Guiana, an overseas department and region of France
 Guyana, formerly known as British Guiana from 1831 until 1966, after the colonies of Berbice, Essequibo, and Demerara, taken from the Netherlands in 1814, were merged into a single colony
 Suriname, formerly Dutch Guiana, until 1814 together with Berbice, Essequibo and Demerara

In the wider context, the Guianas also includes the following two territories:

 Guayana Region in eastern Venezuela (Amazonas, Bolívar, and Delta Amacuro states), formerly the Guayana Province, alternatively known as Spanish Guayana (or Venezuelan Guiana)
 State of Amapá in northern Brazil, known as Portuguese Guiana (or Brazilian Guiana)

The combined population of the three core territories is 1,718,651; 804,567 in Guyana, 612,985 in Suriname and 301,099 in French Guiana.

History

Pre-colonial period
Before the arrival of European colonials, the Guianas were populated by scattered bands of native Arawak people. The native tribes of the Northern Amazon are most closely related to the natives of the Caribbean; most evidence suggests that the Arawaks immigrated from the Orinoco and Essequibo River Basins in Venezuela and Guiana into the northern islands, and were then supplanted by more warlike tribes of Carib Indians, who departed from these same river valleys a few centuries later.

Over the centuries of the pre-colonial period, the ebb and flow of power between Arawak and Carib interests throughout the Caribbean resulted in a great deal of intermingling (some forced through capture, some accidental through contact). This ethnic mixing, particularly in the Caribbean margins like the Guianas, produced a hybridized culture. Despite their political rivalry, the ethnic and cultural blending between the two groups had reached such a level that, by the time of the Europeans' arrival, the Carib/Arawak complex in Guiana was so homogeneous that the two groups were almost indistinguishable to outsiders. Through the contact period following Columbus's arrival, the term "Guiana" was used to refer to all areas between the Orinoco, the Rio Negro, and the Amazon, and was seen so much as a unified, isolated entity that it was often referred to as the “Island of Guiana.”

European colonization
Christopher Columbus first spotted the coast of the Guianas in 1498, but real interest in the exploration and colonization of the Guianas, which came to be known as the "Wild Coast," did not begin until the end of the sixteenth century. Walter Raleigh began the exploration of the Guianas in earnest in 1594. He was in search of a great golden city at the headwaters of the Caroní River. A year later he explored what is now Guyana and eastern Venezuela in search of "Manoa", the legendary city of the king known as El Dorado. Raleigh described the city of El Dorado as being located on Lake Parime far up the Orinoco River in Guyana. Much of his exploration is documented in his books The Discoverie of the Large, Rich, and Bewtiful Empyre of Guiana, published first in 1596, and The Discovery of Guiana, and the Journal of the Second Voyage Thereto, published in 1606.

After the publication of Raleigh's accounts, several other European powers developed interest in the Guianas. The Dutch joined in the exploration of the Guianas before the end of the century. Between the start of the Dutch Revolt in 1568 and 1648, when the Treaty of Münster was signed with the Spanish, the Dutch cobbled together different ethnicities and tribes and religious faiths into a viable economic entity. When beginning an empire, the Dutch concerned themselves more with trade and establishing viable networks and outposts than with claiming tracts of land to act as a buffer against neighbouring states. With this goal in mind, the Dutch dispatched explorer Jacob Cornelisz to survey the area in 1597. His clerk, Adriaen Cabeliau, related the voyage of Cornelisz and his survey of Indian groups and areas of potential trade partnerships in his diary. Throughout the seventeenth century, the Dutch made gains by establishing trading colonies and outposts in the region and in the neighboring Caribbean islands under the banner of the Dutch West India Company. The company, established in 1621 for such purposes, benefited from a larger investment of capital than the English, primarily through foreign investors like Isaac de Pinto, a Portuguese Jew.  The area was also cursorily explored by Amerigo Vespucci and Vasco Núñez de Balboa, and in 1608 the Grand Duchy of Tuscany also organized an expedition to the Guianas, but this was cut short by the untimely death of the Grand Duke.

English and Dutch settlers were regularly harassed by the Spanish and Portuguese, who viewed settlement of the area as a violation of the Treaty of Tordesillas. In 1613, Dutch trading posts on the Essequibo and Corantijn Rivers were completely destroyed by Spanish troops. The troops had been sent into the Guianas from neighboring Venezuela under the premise of stamping out privateering and with the support of a cédula passed by the Spanish Council of the Indies and King Philip III. Nonetheless, the Dutch returned in 1615, founding a new settlement at present-day Cayenne (later abandoned in favor of Suriname), one on the Wiapoco River (now more commonly known as the Oyapock) and one on the upper Amazon. By 1621, a charter was granted by the Dutch States-General, but even a few years prior to the official chartering a fort and trading post had been built at Kijkoveral, under the supervision of Aert Groenewegen, at the confluence of the Essequibo, Cuyuni, and Mazaruni Rivers. British settlers also succeeded in establishing a small settlement in 1606 and a much larger one in modern-day Suriname in 1650, under the leadership of former Barbadian governor Francis Willoughby, Lord Parham.

The French had also made less significant attempts at colonization, first in 1604 along the Sinnamary River. The settlement collapsed within a summer, and initial attempts at settlement near modern-day Cayenne, beginning in 1613, were met with similar setbacks. French priorities — land acquisition and Catholic conversion — were not easily reconciled with the difficulties of initial settlement-building on the Wild Coast. Even as late as 1635, the King of France granted permission to the whole of Guiana to a joint-stock company of Norman merchants. When these merchants made a settlement near the modern city of Cayenne, failure ensued. Eight years later, a reinforcement contingent led by Charles Poncet de Brétigny found only a few of the original colonists left alive, living among the aborigines. Later that year, among the combined total of the original surviving settlers, the reinforcement contingent led by de Brétigny, and a subsequent reinforcement later in the year, only two individuals remained alive long enough to reach the Dutch settlement on the Pomeroon River in 1645, begging for refuge. Though some trading outposts that could be considered permanent settlements were founded as early as 1624, French “possession” of the land now known as French Guiana is not recognized as having taken place until at least 1637. Cayenne itself, the first permanent settlement of comparable size to the Dutch colonies, experienced instability until 1643.

The Dutch appointed a new commandeur of the Guiana settlements in 1742. In this year, Laurens Storm van 's Gravesande took over the region. He held the position for three decades, coordinating the development and expansion of the Dutch colonies from his plantation Soesdyke in Demerara. Gravesande’s tenure brought significant change to the colonies, though his policy was in many ways an extension of his predecessor, Hermanus Gelskerke. Commandeur Gelskerke had begun pressing for change from a trading focus to one of cultivation, especially of sugar. The area east of the existing Essequibo colony, known as Demerara, was relatively isolated and encompassed the trading areas of just a few indigenous tribes, thus it contained only two trading outposts during Gelskerke’s term of office. Demerara, though, showed great potential as a sugar-cultivating area, so the commandeur began shifting focus toward the development of the region, signifying his intentions by transferring the administrative center of the colony from Fort Kijkoveral to Flag Island, on the mouth of the Essequibo River, further east and closer to Demerara. These operations were carried out by Gravesande, acting as the Secretary of the Company under Gelskerke. Upon Gelskerke’s death, Gravesande continued the policy of Demerara expansion and the move to sugar cultivation.

Conflict among the British, Dutch, and French continued throughout the seventeenth century. The Treaty of Breda sealed peace between the English and the Dutch. The treaty allowed the Dutch to retain control over the valuable sugar plantations and factories on the coast of Suriname which had been secured by Abraham Crijnssen earlier in 1667.

All the colonies along the Guiana coast were converted to profitable sugar plantations during the seventeenth and eighteenth centuries. War continued off and on among the three principal powers in the Guianas (the Netherlands, France, and Britain) until a final peace was signed in 1814 (the Convention of London), heavily favouring the British. By this time France had sold off most of its North American territory in the Louisiana Purchase and had lost all but Guadeloupe, Martinique, and French Guiana in the Caribbean region. The Dutch lost Berbice, Essequibo, and Demerara; these colonies were consolidated under a central British administration and would be known after 1831 as British Guiana. The Dutch retained Suriname.

After 1814, the Guianas came to be recognized individually as British Guiana, French Guiana, and Dutch Guiana.

See also
 Borders of Brazil
 Borders of Venezuela
 Guiana Shield

Notes

References

Further reading
 Bahadur, Gaiutra. Coolie Woman: The Odyssey of Indenture. The University of Chicago (2014) 

 
Regions of South America
Divided regions
History of French Guiana
History of Guyana
History of Suriname